Earl Winfield Spencer Jr. (September 20, 1888 – May 29, 1950) was a pioneering U.S. Navy pilot who served as the first commanding officer of Naval Air Station San Diego. He was the first husband of Wallis Simpson, who later married Prince Edward, Duke of Windsor.

Early life and military career
Known as Win, he was born in Kinsley, Kansas, son of Earl Winfield Spencer Sr., a socially prominent Chicago stockbroker, and the former Agnes Lucy Hughes of Jersey. He graduated from the United States Naval Academy in 1910 and in 1917 was sent to San Diego with instructions to set up a permanent naval air station, which was to be used for training exercises, and he became its first commanding officer.

Personal life
Spencer was married five times. Four of his wives were:

Bessie Wallis Warfield (1896–1986), only child of Teackle Wallis Warfield, member of a prominent Maryland family; they married in Baltimore on November 8, 1916. Spencer was alleged to be abusive and an alcoholic. After several separations, the Spencers divorced in December 1927. After a second marriage, to Ernest Aldrich Simpson, and a subsequent divorce, Wallis Spencer married the former King Edward VIII of the United Kingdom and became the Duchess of Windsor.
Mariam J. Maze (1895–1997) the former wife of Albert Cressey Maze (1891–1943). She was the former Miriam Ham, daughter of George and Katie Anastasia (née Eagels) Ham of Portland, Oregon. They married in September 1928 and were divorced in 1936, the same year Spencer was made a Knight of the Order of the Crown of Italy by Benito Mussolini. By this marriage he had one stepson, Robert Claude Maze Sr., Major, USMC (killed in action, 1945). Mariam Spencer married, in 1939, as her third husband, Arthur William Radford, Vice Admiral, USN, future Chairman of the Joint Chiefs of Staff.

Norma Reese Johnson (1891–1944), the widow of Homer Sturtevant Johnson, a Detroit manufacturer who died in 1928, and a daughter of Carl Reese, of Detroit, Michigan. Spencer and Johnson were married in Los Angeles, California, on July 4, 1937. By this marriage he had two stepdaughters: Betty L. Johnson, an actress and songwriter (married Balie Peyton Legare Jr. (1908–1984), a jazz musician, whom she divorced in 1942) and Kathryne Johnson (born circa 1912, married Dell Myron Wade Jr). The Spencers' wedding was a double wedding with Betty and Peyton Legare, whose wedding in February 1937 in Tijuana, Mexico, was not valid under California law and needed to be resolemnized. The couple separated on February 9, 1940, and were divorced later that year in Santa Monica, California. Both parties charged cruelty, and Norma declared that her husband was plagued by what The New York Times'''s announcement of their acrimonious divorce delicately called "habitual intemperance." Time magazine reported, "During a stormy session of accusations and counteraccusations Navyman Spencer, charged with cruelty and habitual intemperance, testified that his weekly liquor bill was only about $10, that his wife 'drank as much of it as I did.'"
Lillian Phillips (1892–1981), daughter of Robert A. and Ella Burgess Phillips, whom he married October 2, 1941.

Later life
Commander Spencer died in Coronado, California. He is buried at Fort Rosecrans National Cemetery in San Diego, California, with his wife Lillian.

In art, screen portrayals, and literature
He was portrayed by actor Ryan Hayward in W.E.'', the 2011 British romantic drama film about the love of Wallis and King Edward VIII co-written and directed by Madonna.

References

1888 births
1950 deaths
People from Kinsley, Kansas
People from Coronado, California
Military personnel from Kansas
Racine College alumni
United States Naval Academy alumni
United States Naval Aviators
Aviators from California
Aviators from Kansas
Abdication of Edward VIII